The 2005 ICF Canoe Sprint World Championships were held in Zagreb, Croatia, in August 2005.

Men race as individuals, pairs and quads over 200m, 500m and 1000m in both Canoe (Canadian) (C) and Kayak (K) events, giving a total of 18 gold medals. Women compete for only 9 gold medals as they race in kayak events only.

This was the 34th championships in canoe sprint.

Highlights
The undoubted stars of the Zagreb event were Natasa Janics and Katalin Kovács of Hungary who completed an unprecedented clean sweep of all three women's K-2 events.

In the men's events, the C-4 200 m final saw Maxim Opalev of Russia win the twelfth world championship gold of his career, thus equalling György Kolonics's record. Andreas Dittmer of Germany retained both the world titles he had won in Gainesville (C-1 500 m and 1000m). Ronald Rauhe and Tim Wieskötter of Germany won their fourth consecutive K-2 500 m title, whilst compatriots Christian Gille and Tomasz Wylenzek followed up their C-2 1000 m 2004 Athens Olympic success with two golds (C-2 500 m and 1000 m).

The championships also marked a change of generation as many stars had retired after the Olympics, especially in the women's events. Two-thirds of the winners at Zagreb were first-time gold medallists. Birgit Fischer won her last two of her record 38 medals, including a bronze in the K-2 200 m event with her niece, Fanny.

Germany topped the medal table, winning 10 of the 27 gold medals, followed by Hungary with six golds, then Spain and Russia with two golds each.

Medal summary

Men's
 Non-Olympic classes

Canoe

Kayak

Women's
 Non-Olympic classes

Kayak

Medal table

References
Official website
Results of Canoe Sprint World Championships 
International Canoe Federation
ICF medalists for Olympic and World Championships - Part 1: flatwater (now sprint): 1936-2007.
ICF medalists for Olympic and World Championships - Part 2: rest of flatwater (now sprint) and remaining canoeing disciplines: 1936-2007.
Results

Icf Canoe Sprint World Championships, 2005
Icf Canoe Sprint World Championships, 2005
ICF Canoe Sprint World Championships
International sports competitions hosted by Croatia
Canoeing in Croatia